Ellen M. Kaisse (born 1949) is an American linguist. She is Professor Emerita of Linguistics at the University of Washington (USA), where she has been affiliated since 1976.

Career
Kaisse earned her PhD in Linguistics in 1977 from Harvard, with a dissertation entitled, Hiatus in Modern Greek. Since then, she has worked on a wide range of issues in theoretical phonology, and particularly on the phonology of Modern Greek, (Argentinian) Spanish and Turkish. She has published on topics ranging from lexical phonology to the phonology-syntax interface to vowel harmony to featural phonology.

Honors and distinctions 
Kaisse served as President of the Linguistic Society of America (LSA) from January 6, 2013 – January 5, 2014. She was inducted as an LSA Fellow in 2015.

Kaisse has co-edited the journal Phonology (Cambridge University Press) with Colin Ewen (Leiden University, The Netherlands) since 1988.

Key publications 
 Harris, James W. and Ellen M. Kaisse. 1999. Palatal vowels, glides and obstruents in Argentinian Spanish, Phonology 16, 117-190.
 Kaisse, Ellen M. 1985. Connected speech: the interaction of syntax and phonology. Academic Press.
 Kaisse, Ellen M. and Arnold Zwicky (eds.). 1987. Phonology Yearbook 4: Syntactic conditions on phonological rules.
 Kaisse, Ellen M.1990. Toward a typology of postlexical rules. S. Inkelas and D. Zec, eds., The syntax-phonology connection. CSLI Publications, 123-138.
 Kaisse, Ellen M. 1992. Can [consonantal] spread? Language 68, 313-332.
 Kaisse, Ellen M. 1993. Rule generalization and rule reordering in Lexical Phonology: a reconsideration, In S. Hargus and E. Kaisse, eds., Studies in Lexical Phonology. Academic Press, 343-363.
 Kaisse, Ellen M. and April McMahon. 2011. Lexical phonology and the lexical syndrome. In M. van Oostendorp et al., eds., The Wiley-Blackwell Companion to phonology, ch. 94.
 Kaisse, Ellen M. 2011. The stricture features. In M. van Oostendorp et al., eds., The Wiley-Blackwell Companion to phonology, ch. 13.

References 

Linguists from the United States
Women linguists
Living people
Harvard University alumni
University of Washington faculty
Linguistic Society of America presidents
Linguistics journal editors
Fellows of the Linguistic Society of America
1949 births